Marineland may refer to:

Marineland of Antibes, an oceanarium in Antibes, France
Marineland of Canada, an oceanarium/amusement park in Niagara Falls, Ontario
Marineland Catalunya, a water park in Spain
Marineland of Florida, an oceanarium in Florida
Marineland, Florida, the community where the oceanarium is located
Marineland Mallorca, a dolphinarium in Spain
Marineland of New Zealand, an oceanarium in Napier, New Zealand; closed in 2008
Marineland of South Australia, an oceanarium in West Beach, South Australia; closed 1988
Marineland of the Pacific, an oceanarium on the Palos Verdes Peninsula, California; closed 1987

See also
Marine World (disambiguation)
Waterland (disambiguation)